Lindauer may refer to:

 Lindauer (surname)
 Lindauer Allee (Berlin U-Bahn)
 Lindauer (wine), a New Zealand sparkling wine
 Lindauer DORNIER GmbH, textile machinery manufacturer located in Lindau, Germany 
 Lindauer Brothers Company, dealers in men's furnishing goods in Chicago, Illinois
 Lindauer (grape), a Swiss wine grape that is also known as Completer
 Lois L. Lindauer Searches, LLC (Lindauer), a global nonprofit executive search firm.
 General term for people of the town of Lindau in Bavaria, Germany

See also 
 Lindau (disambiguation)